Antonia Allagonna Elizabeth "Annelies" Thies (born 24 November 1969, in Groningen) is a sailor from the Netherlands. Thies represented her country at the 2004 Summer Olympics in Athens. With crew members Annemieke Bes en Petronella de Jong Thies took 4th place in the Yngling.

Further reading

2004 Olympics (Athens)

References

Living people
1969 births
Sportspeople from Groningen (city)
Dutch female sailors (sport)
Sailors at the 2004 Summer Olympics – Yngling
Olympic sailors of the Netherlands